Sarab Rural District is a rural district (dehestan) in Giyan District, Nahavand County, Hamadan Province, Iran. At the 2006 census, its population was 6,486, in 1,591 families. The rural district has 6 villages.

References 

Rural Districts of Hamadan Province
Nahavand County